The Sunda cuckooshrike (Coracina larvata) is a species of bird in the family Campephagidae. It is found in Indonesia and Malaysia, where it occurs on Borneo, Sumatra and Java. Its natural habitat is subtropical or tropical moist montane forest.

References

Sunda cuckooshrike
Birds of Malesia
Sunda cuckooshrike
Taxonomy articles created by Polbot